Cylichna thetidis is a species of sea snails or bubble snail, a marine opisthobranch gastropod mollusc in the family Cylichnidae, the chalice bubble snails or canoe bubble snails.

References

 Powell A. W. B., New Zealand Mollusca, William Collins Publishers Ltd, Auckland, New Zealand 1979

External links 
 Photo

Cylichnidae
Gastropods of Australia
Gastropods of New Zealand
Gastropods described in 1903